Gerardo Pierro is an Italian ordinary of the Catholic Church. He served as the Bishop of Tursi-Lagonegro, as the Bishop of Avellino, and as the Archbishop of Salerno-Campagna-Acerno. In this latter role, he simultaneously held the title of Primate of the Kingdom of Naples.

Biography 
After studying at the Archdiocesan Seminary of Salerno and the Pontifical Regional Seminary in Salerno, Pierro was ordained a priest by Demetrio Moscato, Archbishop of Salerno, on 21 December 1957.

On 14 August 1960, he was appointed a parish priest of the Church of San Nicola di Bari in Coperchia di Pellezzano, where he remained until 6 September 1981 when he became Bishop of Tursi-Lagonegro. On 18 November 1974, Pierro received a degree in theology from Pontificia Facoltà Teologica "S. Luigi" (the Pontifical Theological Faculty "San Luigi") in the Posillipo quarter of Naples. He then taught religion at the "G. Da Procida" high school in Salerno and dogmatic theology at the Pontifical Seminary of Salerno's Institute of Religious Sciences.

He was then diocesan president of the Apostolic Union of the Clergy, regional vice delegate, and national counselor of the same organization.

Episcopal ministry 
On 26 June 1981, Pierro was elected Bishop of Tursi-Lagonegro, receiving his episcopal consecration from Cardinal Sebastiano Baggio on 2 August in the Salerno Cathedral. He was then elected Bishop of Avellino on 28 February 1987. On 25 May 1992, he was promoted to Metropolitan Archbishop of Salerno-Campagna-Acerno.

In July 2008, Pierro was delivered a notice of investigation for fraud against the state and misuse of property. In May 2010, he was indicted along with others. Pope Benedict accepted his resignation from pastoral government of the Archdiocese of Salerno-Campagna-Acerno called upon Luigi Moretti, the Vicegerent Archbishop of the Diocese of Rome, to succeed him.

References

External links 
Archdiocese of Salerno-Campagna-Acerno website

Living people
1935 births
People from the Province of Salerno
21st-century Italian Roman Catholic archbishops
Archbishops of Salerno
Bishops of Avellino